Teresa Pilkington is an Irish lawyer who has been a judge of the Court of Appeal since September 2020. She was appointed to the High Court in July 2018, having previously been a barrister with a practice in civil law cases.

Education 
Pilkington attended University College Dublin, from where she obtained a BA degree in 1981. She returned to the university in 1997 to obtain an LL.M. degree in commercial law in 1997.

Legal career 
She was called to the Bar in 1986 and became a senior counsel in 2012. Her practice focused on  property law and probate, construction law, guardianship and charities law.

She was a member of the Property Registration Authority and was appointed to the Irish Financial Services Appeals Tribunal in 2013. She was a member of the Library Committee of the Bar Council.

She frequently lectured on her areas of practice.

Judicial career

High Court 
Pilkington was appointed to the High Court in July 2018. She has heard cases involving defamation, contractual disputes, procurement law, injunctions, bankruptcy, insolvency, company law and judicial review.

In 2018 she rejected an application by Nóirín O'Sullivan to bring defamation proceedings against the Irish Examiner. She oversaw bankruptcy proceedings of Seán Dunne.

She has been a member of the Rules of the Superior Courts Committee.

Court of Appeal 
In August 2020, she was nominated to fill a vacancy on the Court of Appeal following the retirement of Brian McGovern. She was appointed on 17 September 2020.

References

Living people
High Court judges (Ireland)
Judges of the Court of Appeal (Ireland)
Alumni of University College Dublin
Irish women judges
Alumni of King's Inns
21st-century Irish judges
21st-century women judges
Year of birth missing (living people)